Celebrity Beyond is a cruise ship owned by Celebrity Cruises, taking its name from the company's slogan. The third in the Edge-class, the ship was constructed at the Chantiers de l'Atlantique shipyard, and entered service in April 2022. The ship is captained by Kate McCue.

History

Planning
On 25 May 2016, Royal Caribbean Cruises Ltd., parent company of Celebrity, announced that it had signed a memorandum of understanding with the STX Corporation (then owners of Chantiers) for the third and fourth ships of the Edge class.

Construction
Steel cutting for Celebrity Beyond occurred on 28 January 2020, at which point Celebrity confirmed the ship's name. At the same time, it was reported that the ship, and sister ship Celebrity Ascent would be an evolution in the Edge class design and feature an increase in gross tonnage, length, and passenger capacity.

In August 2020, it was announced that the delivery of Beyond (as well as that of Wonder of the Seas) would be delayed by approximately 10 months due to shipyard closures and delays caused by the COVID-19 pandemic. 

On 19 November 2020, the keel for Celebrity Beyond was laid down.

Maiden Voyage

The ship arrived in Southampton on 21 April 2022 for its maiden voyage on 27 April to Barcelona. This initial itinerary called at La Rochelle, Bilbao, Lisbon, Cadiz, Malaga, Palma and concluded in Barcelona. 

On May 10, 2022, Celebrity Cruises announced that gymnast Simone Biles will be the godmother of the ship. The christening ceremony was held in Florida on November 4, 2022.

Kate McCue is the current Captain of Celebrity Beyond and she often brings to the bridge her Sphynx cat named Bug Naked, whose semi-official title on board is “Maneuvering Support Mammal”. Captain Kate McCue is also the first American Woman to Captain a "Mega" Cruise Ship.

Facilities

Like the other Edge-class ships, Celebrity Beyond features Eden, a 270 degree, three-deck observation lounge, which features a ramp connecting decks 5 and 6, in addition to a cafe, a bar, and a dining venue. 

Like the other ships in the Edge class, Celebrity Beyond is fitted with the Magic Carpet tender dock, designed to prevent hull collisions while anchored offshore. While sailing, the Magic Carpet is equipped with a bar and can be used as a patio, when positioned at three different decks (Decks 5, 14, and 16). 

The ship also features a spa and a fitness centre that overlooks the sea from above the wheelhouse  

Beyond was the first in the Celebrity fleet to be equipped with SpaceX Starlink internet connections. The service launched on the September 5, 2022 Celebrate With the CEO cruise.

References

Beyond
Ships built by Chantiers de l'Atlantique
2021 ships